Thomas William Fuller (May 3, 1865 – November 4, 1951), the son of Thomas Fuller, was a Canadian architect. Before his selection as Dominion Architect, Fuller  designed a number of federal buildings in Dawson City, Yukon, some of which are now designated as National Historic Sites of Canada. These include the Post Office (1899); Court House (1900–01); Territorial Administration Building, 5th Avenue (1901); Public School (1901) which burned 1957; and Commissioner's Residence (1901).

He served as Chief Dominion Architect from 1927 to 1936, designing a number of prominent public buildings in Canada. Thomas W. Fuller designed a number of post offices:
Outremont, Quebec, Bernard Avenue, (1928–29); Hespeler, Ontario Queen Street East, (1928); Fort Frances, Ontario (1929); Saskatoon, Saskatchewan, 1st Avenue, 1929; Moncton, New Brunswick (1931); Penetanguishene, Ontario (1931); Perth, Ontario (1933); Montreal, Quebec, St. James Street (1932); Montreal, Quebec Notre-Dame-de-Grace Sherbrooke Street East (1934–35); Fort William, Ontario, Syndicate Avenue near Donald Street (1934); Montreal, Quebec, Central Post Office, Peel Street, (1935); Amherst, Nova Scotia (1935).

His son, Thomas G. Fuller, founded Thomas Fuller Construction company in 1958 which built many public buildings in Ottawa as well as the sheltered harbour for the Britannia Yacht Club. In 2002, the company was awarded a contract to renovate the Canadian Library of Parliament.

Works

External links 
Yukon Nuggets
Thomas W. Fuller, Chief Dominion Architect 1927-1936
Canada`s Historic Places

References

1865 births
1951 deaths
Canadian architects
People of the Klondike Gold Rush
Members of the Royal Canadian Academy of Arts